The problem of universals is an ancient question from metaphysics that has inspired a range of philosophical topics and disputes: Should the properties an object has in common with other objects, such as color and shape, be considered to exist beyond those objects? And if a property exists separately from objects, what is the nature of that existence?

The problem of universals relates to various inquiries closely related to metaphysics, logic, and epistemology, as far back as Plato and Aristotle, in efforts to define the mental connections a human makes when they understand a property such as shape or color to be the same in nonidentical objects.

Universals are qualities or relations found in two or more entities. As an example, if all cup holders are circular in some way, circularity may be considered a universal property of cup holders. Further, if two daughters can be considered female offspring of Frank, the qualities of being female, offspring, and of Frank, are universal properties of the two daughters. Many properties can be universal: being human, red, male or female, liquid or solid, big or small, etc.

Philosophers agree that human beings can talk and think about universals, but disagree on whether universals exist in reality beyond mere thought and speech.

Ancient philosophy
The problem of universals is considered a central issue in traditional metaphysics and can be traced back to Plato and Aristotle's philosophy, particularly in their attempt to explain the nature and status of forms. These philosophers explored the problem through predication.

Plato 
Plato believed that there was a sharp distinction between the world of perceivable objects and the world of universals or forms: one can only have mere opinions about the former, but one can have knowledge about the latter.  For Plato it was not possible to have knowledge of anything that could change or was particular, since knowledge had to be forever unfailing and general.  For that reason, the world of the forms is the real world, like sunlight, while the sensible world is only imperfectly or partially real, like shadows. This Platonic realism, however, in denying that the eternal Forms are mental artifacts, differs sharply with modern forms of idealism.

One of the first nominalist critiques of Plato's realism was that of Diogenes of Sinope, who said "I've seen Plato's cups and table, but not his cupness and tableness."

Aristotle 
Plato's student Aristotle disagreed with his tutor. Aristotle transformed Plato's forms into "formal causes", the blueprints or essences of individual things. Whereas Plato idealized geometry, Aristotle emphasized nature and related disciplines and therefore much of his thinking concerns living beings and their properties. The nature of universals in Aristotle's philosophy therefore hinges on his view of natural kinds. Instead of categorizing being according to the structure of thought, he proposed that the categorical analysis be directed upon the structure of the natural world. He used the principle of predication in Categories, where he established that universal terms are involved in a relation of predication if some facts expressed by ordinary sentences hold.

In his work On Interpretation, he maintained that the concept of "universal" is apt to be predicated of many and that singular is not. For instance, man is a universal while Callias is a singular. The philosopher distinguished highest genera like animal and species like man but he maintained that both are predicated of individual men. This was considered part of an approach to the principle of things, which adheres to the criterion that what is most universal is also most real. Consider for example a particular oak tree. This is a member of a species and it has much in common with other oak trees, past, present and future. Its universal, its oakness, is a part of it. A biologist can study oak trees and learn about oakness and more generally the intelligible order within the sensible world. Accordingly, Aristotle was more confident than Plato about coming to know the sensible world; he was a prototypical empiricist and a founder of induction. Aristotle was a new, moderate sort of realist about universals.

Medieval philosophy

Boethius 
The problem was introduced to the medieval world by Boethius, by his translation of Porphyry's Isagoge. It begins:

"I shall omit to speak about genera and species, as to whether they subsist (in the nature of things) or in mere conceptions only; whether also if subsistent, they are bodies or incorporeal, and whether they are separate from, or in, sensibles, and subsist about these, for such a treatise is most profound, and requires another more extensive investigation".

Boethius, in his commentaries on the aforementioned translation, says that a universal, if it were to exist has to apply to several particulars entirely. He also specifies that they apply simultaneously at once and not in a temporal succession. He reasons that they cannot be mind-independent, i.e. they do not have a real existence, because a quality cannot be both one thing and common to many particulars in such a way that it forms part of a particular's substance, as it would then be partaking of universality and particularity. However, he also says that universals can't also be of the mind since a mental construct of a quality is an abstraction and understanding of something outside of the mind. He concludes that either this representation is a true understanding of the quality, in which case we revert to the earlier problem faced by those who believe universals are real; or, if the mental abstractions were not a true understanding, then 'what is understood otherwise than the thing is false'.

His solution to this problem was to state that the mind is able to separate in thought what is not necessarily separable in reality. He cites the human mind's ability to abstract from concrete particulars as an instance of this. This, according to Boethius, avoids the problem of Platonic universals being out there in the real world, but also the problem of them being purely constructs of the mind in that universals are simply the mind thinking of particulars in an abstract, universal way. His assumption focuses on the problems that language create. Boethius maintained that the structure of language corresponds to the structure of things and that language creates what he regarded as philosophical babble of confused and contradictory accounts of the nature of things. To illustrate his view, suppose that although the mind cannot think of 2 or 4 as an odd number, as this would be a false representation, it can think of an even number that is neither 2 nor 4.

Medieval realism

Boethius mostly stayed close to Aristotle in his thinking about universals. Realism's biggest proponents in the Middle Ages, however, came to be Thomas Aquinas and Duns Scotus. Aquinas argued that both the essence of a thing and its existence were clearly distinct; in this regard he is also Aristotelian.

Duns Scotus argues that in a thing there is no real distinction between the essence and the existence, instead there is only a formal distinction. Scotus believed that universals exist only inside the things that they exemplify, and that they "contract" with the haecceity of the thing to create the individual. As a result of his realist position, he argued strongly against both nominalism and conceptualism, arguing instead for Scotist realism, a medieval response to the conceptualism of Abelard. That is to say, Scotus believed that such properties as 'redness' and 'roundness' exist in reality and are mind-independent entities.

Furthermore, Duns Scotus wrote about this problem in his own commentary (Quaestiones) on Porphyry's Isagoge, as Boethius had done. Scotus was interested in how the mind forms universals, and he believed this to be 'caused by the intellect'. This intellect acts on the basis that the nature of, say, 'humanity' that is found in other humans and also that the quality is attributable to other individual humans.

Medieval nominalism

The opposing view to realism is one called nominalism, which at its strongest maintains that universals are verbal constructs and that they do not inhere in objects or pre-exist them. Therefore, universals in this view are something which are peculiar to human cognition and language. The French philosopher and theologian Roscellinus (1050–1125) was an early, prominent proponent of this view. His particular view was that universals are little more than vocal utterances (voces).

William of Ockham (1285-1347) wrote extensively on this topic. He argued strongly that universals are a product of abstract human thought. According to Ockham, universals are just words or concepts (at best) that only exist in the mind and have no real place in the external world. His opposition to universals was not based on his eponymous Razor, but rather he found that regarding them as real was contradictory in some sense. An early work has Ockham stating that 'no thing outside the soul is universal, either through itself or through anything real or rational added on, no matter how it is considered or understood'. Nevertheless, his position did shift away from an outright opposition to accommodating them in his later works such as the Summae Logicae (albeit in a modified way that would not classify him as a complete realist).

Modern and contemporary philosophy

Hegel
The 19th-century German philosopher Georg Wilhelm Friedrich Hegel discussed the relation of universals and particulars throughout his works. Hegel posited that both exist in a dialectical relationship to one another, that is one exists only in relation and in reference to the other. 

He stated the following on the issue:

Mill

The 19th-century British philosopher John Stuart Mill discussed the problem of universals in the course of a book that eviscerated the philosophy of Sir William Hamilton. Mill wrote, "The formation of a concept does not consist in separating the attributes which are said to compose it from all other attributes of the same object and enabling us to conceive those attributes, disjoined from any others. We neither conceive them, nor think them, nor cognize them in any way, as a thing apart, but solely as forming, in combination with numerous other attributes, the idea of an individual object".

However, he then proceeds to state that Berkeley's position is factually wrong by stating the following:

In other words, we may be "temporarily unconscious" of whether an image is white, black, yellow or purple and concentrate our attention on the fact that it is a man and on just those attributes necessary to identify it as a man (but not as any particular one). It may then have the significance of a universal of manhood.

Peirce
The 19th-century American logician Charles Sanders Peirce, known as the father of pragmatism, developed his own views on the problem of universals in the course of a review of an edition of the writings of George Berkeley. Peirce begins with the observation that "Berkeley's metaphysical theories have at first sight an air of paradox and levity very unbecoming to a bishop". He includes among these paradoxical doctrines Berkeley's denial of "the possibility of forming the simplest general conception". He wrote that if there is some mental fact that works in practice the way that a universal would, that fact is a universal. "If I have learned a formula in gibberish which in any way jogs my memory so as to enable me in each single case to act as though I had a general idea, what possible utility is there in distinguishing between such a gibberish... and an idea?" Peirce also held as a matter of ontology that what he called "thirdness", the more general facts about the world, are extra-mental realities.

James
William James learned about pragmatism. Although James certainly agreed with Peirce and against Berkeley that general ideas exist as a psychological fact, he was a nominalist in his ontology:

There are at least three ways in which a realist might try to answer James' challenge of explaining the reason why universal conceptions are more lofty than those of particulars: the moral–political answer, the mathematical–scientific answer, and the anti-paradoxical answer. Each has contemporary or near-contemporary advocates.

Weaver
The moral or political response is given by the conservative philosopher Richard M. Weaver in Ideas Have Consequences (1948), where he describes how the acceptance of "the fateful doctrine of nominalism" was "the crucial event in the history of Western culture; from this flowed those acts which issue now in modern decadence".

Quine

The noted American philosopher, W. V. O. Quine addressed the problem of universals throughout his career. In his paper, 'On Universals', from 1947, he states the problem of universals is chiefly understood as being concerned with entities and not the linguistic aspect of naming a universal. He says that Platonists believe that our ability to form general conceptions of things is incomprehensible unless universals exist outside of the mind, whereas nominalists believe that such ideas are 'empty verbalism'. Quine himself does not propose to resolve this particular debate. What he does say however is that certain types of 'discourse' presuppose universals: nominalists therefore must give these up. Quine's approach is therefore more an epistemological one, i.e. what can be known, rather than a metaphysical one, i.e. what is real.

Cocchiarella
Nino Cocchiarella put forward the idea that realism is the best response to certain logical paradoxes to which nominalism leads ("Nominalism and Conceptualism as Predicative Second Order Theories of Predication", Notre Dame Journal of Formal Logic, vol. 21 (1980)). It is noted that in a sense Cocchiarella has adopted Platonism for anti-Platonic reasons. Plato, as seen in the dialogue Parmenides, was willing to accept a certain amount of paradox with his forms. Cocchiarella adopts the forms to avoid paradox.

Armstrong
The Australian philosopher David Malet Armstrong has been one of the leading realists in the twentieth century, and has used a concept of universals to build a naturalistic and scientifically realist ontology. In both Universals and Scientific Realism (1978) and Universals: An Opinionated Introduction (1989), Armstrong describes the relative merits of a number of nominalist theories which appeal either to "natural classes" (a view he ascribes to Anthony Quinton), concepts, resemblance relations or predicates, and also discusses non-realist "trope" accounts (which he describes in the Universals and Scientific Realism volumes as "particularism"). He gives a number of reasons to reject all of these, but also dismisses a number of realist accounts.

Penrose
Roger Penrose contends that the foundations of mathematics can't be understood without the Platonic view that "mathematical truth is absolute, external and eternal, and not based on man-made criteria ... mathematical objects have a timeless existence of their own..."

Positions 
There are many philosophical positions regarding universals.

 Platonic realism (also called extreme realism" or exaggerated realism) is the view that universals or forms in this sense, are the causal explanation behind the notion of what things exactly are; (the view that universals are real entities existing independent of particulars).
 Aristotelian realism (also called strong realism or moderate realism) is the rejection of extreme realism. This position establishes the view of a universal as being that of the quality within a thing and every other thing individual to it; (the view that universals are real entities, but their existence is dependent on the particulars that exemplify them).
 Anti-realism is the objection to both positions. Anti-realism is divided into two subcategories; (1) Nominalism and (2) Conceptualism.

Taking "beauty" as example, each of these positions will state the following:

 Beauty is a property that exists in an ideal form independently of any mind or description.
 Beauty is a property that exists only when beautiful things exist.
 Beauty is a property constructed in the mind, so exists only in descriptions of things.

Realism

The school of realism makes the claim that universals are real and that they exist distinctly, apart from the particulars that instantiate them. Two major forms of metaphysical realism are Platonic realism (universalia ante res), meaning "'universals before things'" and Aristotelian realism (universalia in rebus), meaning "'universals in things'". Platonic realism is the view that universals are real entities existing independent of particulars. Aristotelian realism, on the other hand, is the view that universals are real entities, but their existence is dependent on the particulars that exemplify them.

Realists tend to argue that universals must be posited as distinct entities in order to account for various phenomena. A common realist argument said to be found in Plato's writings, is that universals are required for certain general words to have meaning and for the sentences in which they occur to be true or false. Take the sentence "Djivan Gasparyan is a musician" for instance. The realist may claim that this sentence is only meaningful and expresses a truth because there is an individual, Djivan Gasparyan, who possesses a certain quality: musicianship. Therefore, it is assumed that the property is a universal which is distinct from the particular individual who has the property.

Nominalism

Nominalists assert that only individuals or particulars exist and deny that universals are real (i.e. that they exist as entities or beings; universalia post res). The term "nominalism" comes from the Latin nomen ("name"). Four major forms of nominalism are predicate nominalism, resemblance nominalism, trope nominalism, and conceptualism. One with a nominalist view claims that we predicate the same property of/to multiple entities, but argues that the entities only share a name and do not have a real quality in common.

Nominalists often argue this view by claiming that nominalism can account for all the relevant phenomena, and therefore—by Occam's razor, and its principle of simplicity—nominalism is preferable, since it posits fewer entities. Different variants and versions of nominalism have been endorsed or defended by many, including Chrysippus, Ibn Taymiyyah, William of Ockham, Ibn Khaldun, Rudolf Carnap, Nelson Goodman, David Lewis, H. H. Price, and D. C. Williams.

Conceptualism 
Conceptualism is a position that is meshed between realism and nominalism. Conceptualists believe that universals can indeed be real, but only existing as concepts within the mind. Conceptualists argue that the "concept" of universals are not mere "inventions but are reflections of similarities among particular things themselves." For example, the concept of 'man' ultimately reflects a similarity amongst Socrates and Kant.

See also

 Abstract object
 Bundle theory
 Constructor theory
 Object (philosophy)
 Observation 
 Philosophy of mathematics
 Platonic form
 Present
 Qualia
 Realism (philosophy)
 Self
 Similarity (philosophy)
 Transcendental nominalism
 Universality (philosophy)
 Tianxia
 Ubuntu

Notes

References and further reading
 Historical studies
 Klima, Gyula (2008). "The Medieval Problem of Universals", The Stanford Encyclopedia of Philosophy, Edward N. Zalta (ed.). (link)
 Pinzani, Roberto (2018). The Problem of Universals from Boethius to John of Salisbury, Leiden: Brill.
 Spade, Paul Vincent. (1994, ed., transl.), "Five Texts on the Mediaeval Problem of Universals: Porphyry, Boethius, Abelard, Duns Scotus, Ockham", Hackett Pub Co Inc.

 Contemporary studies
 Armstrong, David (1989). Universals, Westview Press.
 Bacon, John (2008). "Tropes", The Stanford Encyclopedia of Philosophy, Edward N. Zalta (ed.). (link)
 Cocchiarella, Nino (1975). "Logical Atomism, Nominalism, and Modal Logic", Synthese.
 Feldman, Fred (2005). "The Open Question Argument: What It Isn't; and What It Is", Philosophical Issues vol. 15. 
 Lewis, David (1983). "New Work for a Theory of Universals", Australasian Journal of Philosophy.
 Loux, Michael J. (1998). Metaphysics: A Contemporary Introduction, N.Y.: Routledge.
 Loux, Michael J. (2001). "The Problem of Universals" in Metaphysics: Contemporary Readings, Michael J. Loux (ed.), N.Y.: Routledge, pp. 3–13.
 MacLeod, M. & Rubenstein, E. (2006). "Universals", The Internet Encyclopedia of Philosophy, J. Fieser & B. Dowden (eds.). (link)
 Moreland, JP. (2001). "Universals." Montreal: McGill-Queens University Press.
 Price, H. H. (1953). "Universals and Resemblance", Ch. 1 of Thinking and Experience, Hutchinson's University Library.
 Quine, W. V. O. (1961). "On What There is," in From a Logical Point of View, 2nd/ed. N.Y: Harper and Row.
 Rodriguez-Pereyra, Gonzalo (2008). "Nominalism in Metaphysics", The Stanford Encyclopedia of Philosophy, Edward N. Zalta (ed.). (link)
 Russell, Bertrand (1912). "The World of Universals," in The Problems of Philosophy, Oxford University Press.
 Swoyer, Chris (2000). "Properties", The Stanford Encyclopedia of Philosophy, Edward N. Zalta (ed.). (link)
 Williams, D. C. (1953). "On the Elements of Being", Review of Metaphysics, vol. 17.

External links
 
 Internet Encyclopedia of Philosophy on Universals
 The Problem of Universals in Antiquity and the Middle Ages with an annotated bibliography
 The Catholic Encyclopedia on Nominalism, Realism, and Conceptualism
 The Friesian School on Universals

Epistemology
Ontology
Cognition
Universals